Borowiany refers to the following places in Poland:

 Borowiany, Opole Voivodeship
 Borowiany, Silesian Voivodeship